Argo was a 2009 spacecraft mission concept by NASA to the outer planets and beyond. The concept included flybys of Jupiter, Saturn, Neptune, and a Kuiper belt object. A focus on Neptune and its largest moon Triton would have helped answer some of the questions generated by Voyager 2 flyby in 1989, and would have provided clues to ice giant formation and evolution.

Mission
The Argo mission was meant to compete for the New Frontiers mission 4 (~$650M). One of the reasons Argo was not formally proposed was the shortage of plutonium-238 for the required radioisotope thermoelectric generator (RTG) for electric power. The current launch window for this mission had been particularly favorable. It opened in 2015 and lasted through the end of 2019, so future missions would need to be redesigned for the relevant planetary alignments.

It was noted that although it offered a Neptune mission at the price of New Frontier's budget, it would be flyby only, limiting the amount of time at Neptune and Triton compared to an orbiter. However, the advantage would be access to a wide variety of Kuiper belt objects by using a gravity assist at Neptune, which would allow a wide range of objects to potentially be targeted. In addition, with a flyby of Jupiter and Saturn, the Planetary Society compared the mission to Voyager 2.

Itinerary
During its flybys of the giant planets, there would have been potentially well over 100 other moons that could have been studied, and beyond Neptune, the possibility of visiting Kuiper belt objects.

See also
New Horizons probe, performed a Pluto flyby in 2015
New Horizons 2

References

External links
Future Planetary Exploration - Argo

Proposed NASA space probes
Missions to Neptune
Triton (moon)